Dmitrovsky District is an administrative and municipal district (raion), one of the twenty-four in Oryol Oblast, Russia. It is located in the southwest of the oblast. Its administrative center is the town of Dmitrovsk. Population: 12,196 (2010 Census);  The population of Dmitrovsk accounts for 46.3% of the district's total population.

Notable residents 

Saul Abramzon (1905–1977), ethnographer, born in Dmitrovsk 
Ivan Mosyakin (1947–2022), politician, born in Voronino

References

Notes

Sources

Districts of Oryol Oblast